Hasanabad-e Majd ol Dolleh, also known as Ḩasanābād, is a village in Ahmadabad Rural District, in the Central District of Nazarabad County, Alborz Province, Iran. At the 2006 census, its population was 77, in 18 families.

References 

Populated places in Nazarabad County